Buzykino is a rural locality (a village) in Nikolskoye Rural Settlement, Kaduysky District, Vologda Oblast, Russia. The population was 4 as of 2002.

Geography 
Buzykino is located 35 km north of Kaduy (the district's administrative centre) by road. Postnikovo is the nearest rural locality.

References 

Rural localities in Kaduysky District